X̂ is the Latin letter X with a circumflex. The letter is used in the modern orthography of the Aleut language and in the current Alaska Native Language Center alphabet of the Haida language.

In mathematics, x̂ often refers to the unit vector in the +X direction.

References

Aleut language
Haida language